The Leatherman ( 1839–) was a vagabond famous for his handmade leather suit of clothes who traveled through the northeastern United States on a regular circuit between the Connecticut River and the Hudson River from roughly 1857 to 1889. Of unknown origin, he was thought to be French-Canadian because of his fluency in the French language, his "broken English", and the French-language prayer book found on his person after his death. His identity remains unknown, and controversial. He walked a repeating  route year after year, which took him through certain towns in western Connecticut and eastern New York, returning to each town every 34–36 days.

Life

Living in rock shelters and "leatherman caves", as they are now locally known, the Leatherman stopped at towns along his  loop about every five weeks for food and supplies. He was dubbed the "Leatherman" as his adornment of hat, scarf, clothes, and shoes were handmade from leather.

An early article in the Burlington Free Press dating to April 7, 1870, refers to him as the "Leather-Clad Man". It also states that he spoke rarely and when addressed would simply speak in monosyllables. According to contemporary rumors, he hailed from Picardy, France.

Fluent in French, he communicated mostly with grunts and gestures, rarely using his broken English. When asked about his background, he would abruptly end the conversation. Upon his death, a French prayer book was found among his possessions. He declined meat on Fridays, giving rise to speculation that he was Roman Catholic.

It is unknown how he earned money. One store kept a record of an order: "one loaf of bread, a can of sardines, one-pound of fancy crackers, a pie, two quarts of coffee, one gill of brandy and a bottle of beer"

The Leatherman was well known in Connecticut. He was reliable in his rounds, and people would have food ready for him, which he often ate on their doorsteps. Ten towns along the Leatherman's route passed ordinances exempting him from the state "tramp law" passed in 1879.

Health
The Leatherman survived blizzards and other foul weather by heating his rock shelters with fire. Indeed, while his face was reported to be frostbitten at times during the winter, by the time of his death he had not lost any fingers, unlike other tramps of the time and area.

The Connecticut Humane Society had him arrested and hospitalized in 1888, which resulted in a diagnosis of "sane except for an emotional affliction", after which he was released, as he had money and desired freedom. He ultimately died from cancer of the mouth due to tobacco use. His body was found on March 24, 1889, in his Saw Mill Woods cave on the farm of George Dell in the town of Mount Pleasant, New York, near Ossining.

Grave

The Leatherman's grave is in the Sparta Cemetery, on Route 9 in Ossining, New York. The following inscription was carved on his original tombstone:

The Leatherman's grave was subsequently moved further from Route 9. When the first grave was dug up, no traces were found of the Leatherman's remains, only some coffin nails, which were reburied in a new pine box, along with dirt from the old grave site. Nicholas Bellantoni, a University of Connecticut archaeologist and the supervisor of the excavation, cited time, the effect of traffic over the shallow original gravesite, and possible removal of graveside material by a road-grading project for the complete destruction of hard and soft tissue in the grave. The new tombstone, installed on May 25, 2011, simply reads "The Leatherman".

Identity controversy
The Leatherman's former tombstone read: "Final resting place of Jules Bourglay of Lyons, France, 'The Leather Man'…" He is identified with that name in many accounts. However, according to researchers including Dan W. DeLuca, as well as his New York death certificate, his identity remains unknown. This name first appeared in a story published in the Waterbury Daily American on August 16, 1884, but was later retracted on March 25, 26, and 27, 1889, and also in The Meriden Daily Journal on March 29, 1889. DeLuca was able to get a new headstone installed when the Leatherman's grave was moved away from Route 9 to another location within the cemetery on May 25, 2011. The new brass plaque simply reads "The Leatherman".

Exhumation and reburial

The Leatherman's original grave in Sparta Cemetery was within  of Route 9. His remains were exhumed and were reburied at a different site in the cemetery on May 25, 2011.  No visible remains were recovered during the exhumation. Rather, coffin nails and soil recovered from the original burial plot were reburied at the new site. Part of the reason for the exhumation process was to test his remains to determine his origins.

Towns visited
The Leatherman's circuit took in the following towns:

Brewster, New York
North Salem, New York
Ridgefield, Connecticut
Branchville, Connecticut
Georgetown, Connecticut
Redding, Connecticut
Danbury, Connecticut
Woodbury, Connecticut
Watertown, Connecticut
Thomaston, Connecticut
Terryville, Connecticut
Bridgewater, Connecticut
Waterbury, Connecticut
Bristol, Connecticut
Forestville, Connecticut
New Britain, Connecticut
Berlin, Connecticut
Old Saybrook, Connecticut
Guilford, Connecticut
Branford, Connecticut
East Haven, Connecticut
New Haven, Connecticut
Bronxville, New York
Stratford, Connecticut
Bridgeport, Connecticut
Trumbull, Connecticut
Norwalk, Connecticut
New Canaan, Connecticut
Stamford, Connecticut
Greenwich, Connecticut
White Plains, New York
Armonk, New York
Chappaqua, New York
Ossining, New York
Sleepy Hollow, New York
Mount Kisco, New York
Bedford Hills, New York
Pound Ridge, New York
Yorktown, New York
Peekskill, New York
Somers, New York
Derby, Connecticut
Woodbridge, Connecticut
Naugatuck, Connecticut
Hamden, Connecticut
Southington, Connecticut
Burlington, Connecticut
Middletown, Connecticut
Meriden, Connecticut
Portland, Connecticut
Wilton, Connecticut

Popular media
 The Leatherman inspired a song by the American rock band Pearl Jam, "Leatherman". It was released as a B-side of the single "Given to Fly" from the 1998 album Yield.
The song "Mennyt mies" by Finnish singer-songwriter J. Karjalainen makes a reference to "Uuden-Englannin nahkamies" ("New England Leatherman").
 Leatherman was the subject of a 1984 video documentary which was shown on Connecticut Public Television.
 In 1965, on his program Perception, Dick Bertel interviewed Mark Haber (1899–1994) about the Leatherman on Channel 3, WTIC-TV (WFSB since 1974) in Hartford, Connecticut.

References

External links
  1984 documentary
"Old Leather Man" - Stories of the 364 Mile Man
 Old Leather Man and James F. Rodgers
 New York Times - The Story of an Old Man and the Road
 Dan DeLuca interviewed
 The Leatherman
 Leatherman's Cave in Watertown
 Connecticut forest & Parks
 The Leatherman's Loop
 Cold Spots: The Legend of the Leatherman

Mapped routes
 Brewster–Waterbury, 77.7 miles
 Waterbury–Stratford, 109 miles
 Stratford–Chappaqua, 65.5 miles
 Chappaqua–Woodbridge, 115 miles
 Woodbridge–Brewster, 183 miles

1889 deaths
Ascetics
Connecticut folklore
Deaths from cancer in New York (state)
Deaths from oral cancer
Hermits
Homeless people
New York (state) folklore
Unidentified people
Year of birth uncertain
Year of birth unknown